The Washakie Station Site is a former way station on the Overland Trail in Carbon County, Wyoming. Built in 1862, the station was on a heavily traveled stage and emigration route. The station was a stone structure with a dirt roof over pole rafters. Remains of the station consist of foundations and ruined sandstone walls. The site was placed on the National Register of Historic Places on December 6, 1978.

References

External links
 Washakie Station Site at the Wyoming State Historic Preservation Office

National Register of Historic Places in Carbon County, Wyoming
Overland Trail
Stagecoach stations on the National Register of Historic Places in Wyoming